Shimane Kgope Ntshweu (born 8 May 1981) is a Botswana footballer who plays as a midfielder for Mogoditshane Fighters. He played for the Botswana national football team between 1999 and 2002.

International career

International goals
Scores and results list Botswana's goal tally first.

References

External links
 

Association football midfielders
Botswana footballers
Botswana international footballers
1981 births
Living people
Mogoditshane Fighters players